Kula is a town and district of Manisa Province in the Aegean region of Turkey. According to the 2000 census, population of the district is 52,986 of which 24,217 live in the town of Kula.

History
From 1867 until 1922, Kula was part of the Aidin Vilayet of the Ottoman Empire. Until at least 1923, the town was inhabited by a mixed population of Christians and Muslims. The Christian population was composed of Turkified descendants of the original Greek inhabitants of the town, as well as by more recent immigrants from Samos and other Aegean islands.

Economy
As of 1920, Kula's main industry was carpet making.

Yanıkyöre volcanic rock formations
The district is renowned for the cone-shaped volcanic rock formations, numbering at about eighty, in the nearby Yanıkyöre (literally the burnt land) area, also sometimes still referred to, including in Turkey, under the Greek name of Katakekaumene, which has the same meaning. Increasingly brought to the attention of a wider public in recent years as a natural curiosity, other recently coined terms to describe the area include "Cappadocia of the Aegean Region, Turkey" or even "Kuladocia". 
 Kula Volcanic Geopark was accepted and certificated by UNESCO on 6 September 2013 at 37th UNESCO general conference in Naples. So that Kula Volcanic Geopark joined UNESCO Global Geopark Network. Also this patent became the first geopark of Turkey, 58th geopark in Europe, and 96th geopark in the world.

See also
 Kula volcano
 Gökçeören, a town in the district

References

Notes

Sources

 

Populated places in Manisa Province
Kula, Manisa